École supérieure angevine en informatique et productique (ESAIP) a French engineering College created in 1987.

The school trains engineers engineers in two specialities: digital technology, risk management and the environment.

Located in Saint-Barthélemy-d'Anjou close to Angers, as well as in Aix-en-Provence, the ESAIP is a private higher education institution of general interest recognised by the State. The school is a member of the Conférence des Grandes écoles (CGE).

References

External links
 ESAIP

Engineering universities and colleges in France
Aix-en-Provence
ESAIP
Angers
Educational institutions established in 1987
1987 establishments in France